

Buildings and structures

Buildings

 The Taj Mahal in Agra, India, is under construction, probably by Ustad Ahmad Lahori, to a commission by Shah Jahan. The mosque and jawab in the complex are completed in 1643.
 1640
 Børsen in Copenhagen, designed by Lorentz and Hans van Steenwinckel the Younger and begun in 1619, is completed.
 59–60 Lincoln's Inn Fields, London (later known as Lindsey House), probably designed by Inigo Jones and begun about 1638, is completed.
 Butterwalk, Dartmouth, England, is completed.
 1641
 Tron Kirk in Edinburgh, Scotland, designed by John Mylne, is dedicated.
 The Mauritshuis at The Hague in the Dutch Republic, designed by Jacob van Campen and Pieter Post, is completed.
 1645–1648 – Main structure of Potala Palace in Lhasa, Tibet, is built.
 1646
 The St. Mary Magdalene Chapel, Dingli, Malta, is rebuilt after the original chapel had collapsed.
 Chehel Sotoun in Isfahan, Persia, is completed.
 New Church of Saint-Sulpice, Paris, is begun to designs of 1636 by Christophe Gamard; it will not be completed until the later 18th century.
 1647 – The Changdeokgung in Seoul, Korea, is reconstructed.
 1648 – Buildings commissioned by Shah Jahan in India:
 April 6: Red Fort, Delhi, is completed to designs by Ustad Ahmad Lahori.
 Jama Mosque, Agra, is built.

Births
 1642 – Giovanni Barbara, Maltese architect and military engineer (died 1728)
 c.1645 – William Winde, English gentleman architect (died 1722)
 1645: December 27 – Giovanni Antonio Viscardi, Swiss baroque architect working in Bavaria (died 1713)
 1646: April 16 – Jules Hardouin Mansart, French baroque architect (died 1708)
 1647 – Henry Aldrich, English polymath and amateur architect (died 1710)
 1648 – Pietro Perti, Ticinese architect and sculptor working in Lithuania (died 1714)

Deaths
 1646: April 10 – Santino Solari, Italian-born architect working in Salzburg (born 1576)
 1647: August 24 – Nicholas Stone, English sculptor and architect (born 1586/7)

References

Architecture